René Tretschok (born 23 December 1968) is a German former professional footballer who played as a midfielder. As a player of Borussia Dortmund he was part of their Champions League victory in 1997. He scored an important goal in the semi final of their victorious campaign against Manchester United, giving Dortmund a crucial 1–0 lead going into the second leg. He was then rewarded with a place on the bench in the final, however he remained unused for the entire match.

Coaching career 
On 25 June 2009, he was named as the new manager of the Hertha BSC Under-19 squad. After Michael Skibbe was sacked as manager of Hertha on 12 February 2012, Tretschok was appointed caretaker.

Honours
Borussia Dortmund
Bundesliga: 1994–95, 1995–96
UEFA Champions League: 1996–97
DFL-Supercup: 1995

Hertha Berlin
DFL-Ligapokal: 2001, 2002

References

External links 
 
 
 Fussballschule Tretschok

1968 births
Living people
People from Bitterfeld-Wolfen
German footballers
East German footballers
Association football midfielders
Bundesliga players
2. Bundesliga players
Hallescher FC players
Borussia Dortmund players
Tennis Borussia Berlin players
1. FC Köln players
Hertha BSC players
Hertha BSC II players
SV Babelsberg 03 players
German football managers
Bundesliga managers
Hertha BSC managers
UEFA Champions League winning players
SV Babelsberg 03 managers
Footballers from Saxony-Anhalt
People from Bezirk Halle